Noventa di Piave is a town in the Metropolitan City of Venice, Veneto, northern Italy. It is east of SP83 provincial road, and there is an exit nearby on the A4 motorway.

Main sights
Saint Maurus the Martyr Church
Villa Da Mula Guardnieri
Villa Bortoluzzi Del Pra
Archaeological area of San Mauro

References

Category:Lists of municipalities of Italy

Cities and towns in Veneto